Santishree Dhulipudi Pandit is an Indian academic and the current Vice-chancellor of Jawaharlal Nehru University, New Delhi(JNU).She is the first woman to hold the office. She was previously serving as Professor of Political Science at Savitribai Phule Pune University. She was appointed as 13th Vice Chancellor  of Jawaharlal Nehru University by Ministry of Education on February 7, 2022

Early life and education
Santishree Dhulipudi Pandit born on 15 July 1962 in Leningrad, Soviet Union (present day Saint Petersberg, Russia).

She did her BA and MA from Presidency College, Chennai and completed M.Phil. and PhD in International relations from School of International studies at Jawaharlal Nehru University. She also received a Diploma in Social Work from California State University and postgraduate diploma in Peace and Conflict studies from Uppsala University.

References

Indian academic administrators
Living people
1962 births